Nemilithippiakudi is a village in the Orathanadu taluk of Thanjavur district, Tamil Nadu, India.

Demographics 

As per the 2001 census, Nemilithippiakudi had a total population of 2719 with 1361 males and 1358 females. The sex ratio was 998. The literacy rate was 75.35.

References 

 

Villages in Thanjavur district